Lutos (Ruto) is a Central Sudanic language of CAR and Chad. Two distinctive dialects are Lutos/Ruto proper and Nduka.

References

Bongo–Bagirmi languages